Eriogaster arbusculae is a moth in the family Lasiocampidae first described by Christian Friedrich Freyer in 1849. It is found in parts of the Alps and mountainous areas of Fennoscandia.

The wingspan is 31–35 mm for males and 36–43 mm for females. The ground colour of the forewings is dark reddish brown to greyish brown. The hindwings are lighter. There is one generation per year with adults on wing from April to July.

The larvae feed on the leaves of Vaccinium myrtillus, Vaccinium uliginosum, Betula, Salix and Alnus species. Larvae can be found from June to August. Pupation takes place in a cocoon. The species overwinters in the pupal stage. It may overwinter multiple years.

References

External links

 Moths and Butterflies of Europe and North Africa

 Lepiforum.de

Moths described in 1849
Eriogaster
Moths of Europe
Taxa named by Christian Friedrich Freyer